Western or Bie Pas Gilaki is a dialect of the Gilaki language spoken in the western portion of Gilan Province, Iran.

Distribution
The Gilaki language consists of three dialects; Western (Bie Pas), Eastern (Bie Pish) and Galeshi (Deylami). Bie Pas Gilaki is spoken west of Sepid Rud river.

According to Glottolog, Western Gilaki is the predominant dialect in Fuman, Rasht and Bandar-e Anzali. According to the scholar and geographer Manouchehr Sotoudeh, Bie Pas Gilaki is spoken in Chahar Farizeh (Bandar-e Anzali), Gaskar/Ziabar), Kasma, Tulem (Sowme'eh Sara), Shaft, Sangar (Rasht) and Lasht-e Nesha.

References 

Northwestern Iranian languages